Euxoa edictalis is a moth of the family Noctuidae first described by Smith in 1893. It is found in North America from south central Alberta and east-central Montana, west to south-central British Columbia, south to central California, southern Nevada, central Utah and western Colorado.

The wingspan is 35–39 mm. Adults are on wing in May in Alberta. There is one generation per year.

References

Euxoa
Moths of North America
Moths described in 1893